Holy Name Cathedral in Chicago is the seat of the Archdiocese of Chicago, one of the largest Roman Catholic dioceses in the United States. The current Archbishop of Chicago is Cardinal Blase J. Cupich. Dedicated on November 21, 1875, Holy Name Cathedral replaced the Cathedral of Saint Mary and the Church of the Holy Name, which were destroyed by the Great Chicago Fire of 1871. A cornerstone inscription still bears faint indications of bullet marks from the murder of North Side Gang member Hymie Weiss, who was killed in front of the church (at the edge of the street, roughly a foot or two south of where the cornerstone is) on October 11, 1926.

During renovations, a fire in 2009 caused major damage to the roof and interior of the church.  The damage was repaired and the cathedral reopened later that year.

Architecture and furnishings

Holy Name Cathedral was built in the Gothic revival architectural style while at the same time integrating motifs symbolic of the message of the modern Church. Overall, the cathedral features motifs meant to instill an ambience of physically dwelling in the biblical tree of life.

Bronze cathedral doors
The first feature that greets worshipers are massive bronze doors designed by Albert J. Friscia that weigh  each. The doors introduce the overall "Tree of Life" theme with intricate details that serve to make the doors look like overwhelming planks of wood. The doors possess a hydraulic system that allows them to be opened with the push of a finger. Beyond the doors is a vestibule encased in glass.

Resurrection crucifix
Once inside the church, the most striking feature is the suspended Resurrection Crucifix sculpted by the artist Ivo Demetz. Adorning the walls of the nave are the Stations of the Cross by artist Goffredo Verginelli depicting the Passion, Crucifixion and Resurrection of Christ. The stations are cast in bronze and framed in red Rocco Alicante marble.

Ambo of the Evangelists
Various bronze sculptures are featured in other parts of the church. One of the largest pieces is the Ambo of the Evangelists by Eugenio de Courten. An ambo, in church liturgy, is the lectern from which readings of Holy Scripture are proclaimed. The bronze casting depicts the authors of the Gospels with their symbols: Matthew the angel representing the Gospel of the Church; Mark, the lion and inspiration for Peter's teachings or catechesis; Luke, the ox, for his recounting of Christ's infancy; John, the eagle, for the writer of the Spiritual Gospel, recounting the story of "the Word made flesh."

Ambo of the Epistle Writers
Also by de Courten is the Ambo of the Evangelists, a bronze casting depicting the authors of the apostolic letters to the early Church communities: Peter, with keys to the Kingdom of God; Paul, who died by the sword; James, representing faith sustained by good works; and Jude, carrying a whip representing correction.  This particular ambo is used by lectors and cantors during Sunday Masses and other special Church feasts and memorials.

Cathedral altar
Six tons of monolithic red-black Rosso Imperiale di Solberga granite forms the mensa or table top of the altar. The pedestal is encircled by a bronze bas-relief depicting Old Testament scenes of sacrificial offerings and preparation: Abel's offering of the first sacrifice, the priest Melchizedek giving bread and wine, Abraham's willingness to sacrifice his son Isaac, and the Prophet Elijah receiving bread and water from the Angel of the Lord for strength to continue on his journey. The consecrated altar contains relics, or actual artifacts from the bodies of Saint John the Apostle and Saint Timothy.

Cathedra of the See of Chicago
A cathedra, or bishop's throne, is what makes the church a cathedral. It is from this chair that Sedes Chicagiensis, or See of Chicago, is presided over by the archbishop of Chicago. Unlike most Roman Catholic cathedra, the Cathedra of the See of Chicago is plain and simple. Its back contains three panels depicting the first Christian teachers: Christ in the center panel, Saint Peter to his right, and Saint Paul to his left.

Sanctuary Panels of the Holy Name
Above the cathedra are the Sanctuary Panels of the Holy Name, five bronze panels by Attilio Selva representing the Holy Name of Jesus from which the church gets its name. The first panel is of Simeon contemplating the Infant Savior whom Mary presents in the Temple.  The second panel depicts the Mystery of the Trinity and an angel carrying the monogram of Christ to earth. The third panel is of the Risen Christ proclaimed as Lord. The fourth panel is of the Presentation of Jesus in the Temple showing Mary and Joseph presenting the child for circumcision and naming. The last panel is of the Priesthood of Jesus, with Christ adorned in vestments presenting the chalice to all people.

Pipe organs
The cathedral contains two fine pipe organs: a large 71-stop, 4-manual instrument in the west end gallery constructed by Flentrop firm of Zaandam, Netherlands; and a smaller 19-stop, 2-manual instrument in the south chancel by Casavant Frères of Saint-Hyacinthe, Quebec, Canada.

Galeri of the Cardinals
Holy Name Cathedral continues the tradition of raising the galero, a wide-brimmed tasseled hat, of a deceased cardinal over the cathedra from the highest point of the semicircular, domed cathedral apse. The galero is hung in Holy Name Cathedral where they remain until they are reduced to dust, symbolizing how all earthly glory is passing. Looking up above the cathedra are the galeri of Cardinals Mundelein, Stritch, Meyer, Cody, Bernardin, and George.

Great Chicago fire of 1871
At the time of the founding of the Diocese of Chicago on September 30, 1843, Bishop William Quarter led his faithful from the Cathedral of Saint Mary at the southwest corner of Madison and Wabash Streets. A few years later in 1851, an immense brick church called the Church of the Holy Name was being constructed on State Street between Huron and Superior streets. Its cornerstone was set in 1852. In October 1871, however, both churches were destroyed as the Great Chicago Fire engulfed all of the city. Church of the Holy Name pastor John McMullen travelled the country to raise funds to rebuild the churches and to aid the homeless of Chicago. Meanwhile, Chicago's Catholics were forced to worship in what was called the shanty cathedral, a boarded-up burnt house on Cass Street. They worshiped there for over four years.

Breaking ground for the new cathedral
In 1874, Brooklyn architect Patrick Charles Keely, who would later also design St. Stanislaus Kostka Church, was selected to draw plans for the new cathedral of Chicago. On July 19 of that year, the cornerstone was laid. On November 21 of the following year, Bishop Thomas Foley dedicated the church and christened it the Cathedral of the Holy Name. In 1880, the Diocese of Chicago was reorganized to become the Archdiocese of Chicago and Holy Name Cathedral became the church of primacy over several other dioceses in the Midwest United States.

Early renovations
In 1888, surveyors noticed that the cathedral was sagging on its Superior Street side. This prompted the archbishop to commence with the cathedral's first renovation projects. By 1915, Holy Name Cathedral was balanced out and saved from sinking into the ground. That same year, James Edward Quigley, Archbishop of Chicago, died. The first major Mass of the newly rededicated cathedral was the late archbishop's funeral.

Emergency repairs
Holy Name Cathedral underwent extensive emergency repairs from February 2008 through August 2008 due to a piece of the ornate wooden ceiling falling to the floor the night of February 10, 2008. Upon further inspection and more pieces falling—the cathedral was closed for emergency repairs. It reopened to the public for weekend Masses the weekend of August 30–31. It fully reopened on November 17, 2008.

It closed again after a major fire on February 4, 2009, which started in the attic where workers were finishing up emergency work that began in February 2008. The cause of the fire was determined to be a faulty ice melting system in the roof line of the church. The facility suffered extensive water damage. Fr. Matthew Compton, after going door to door through the rectory to help evacuate, then rescued the Blessed Sacrament with a fire department chaplain.
Firefighters entered the burning attic without their helmets and oxygen tanks. A fire in the attic of a building in the style of Holy Name Cathedral is usually declared a loss and just contained; the action of the firefighters that day saved The structure.  The restoration work following the fire was performed by Daprato Rigali Studios. All Masses for the weekend were moved to the auditorium as they had been during 2008. The Archdiocese of Chicago floated a loan to Holy Name in order to finance the repairs. The cathedral reopened the weekend of August 1, 2009.

George Mundelein

In 1924, Archbishop George Mundelein was elevated by the pope to become a cardinal. When he returned from consistory at the Vatican, the new cardinal was greeted at Holy Name Cathedral with a celebratory procession of over 80,000 Catholics. Mundelein also managed to get Chicago named the host city for the 28th International Eucharistic Congress in 1926, with the opening mass being held at the cathedral.

When Cardinal Mundelein died unexpectedly in his sleep in October 1939, Chicago City Hall hastily paved State Street where the subway was being constructed to accommodate the great influx of mourners expected to make the pilgrimage. As Cardinal Mundelein lay in state in the nave of Holy Name Cathedral, over a million people paid their last respects.

Second Vatican Council
As soon as the Second Vatican Council was concluded in the 1960s, Holy Name Cathedral proceeded with a massive, controversial renovation project to alter the cathedral interior. From Easter 1968 to 1969, the cathedral was closed and Masses were held in various locations including a nearby school gymnasium. At this time all of the stained glass, oil paintings, and marble statuary was removed from the interior of the cathedral. The end result was a relatively plain room, dominated by a six-ton granite altar and Resurrection crucifix. At midnight on Christmas Eve of 1969, Holy Name Cathedral was reopened.

Papal visit of 1979
In October 1979, Pope John Paul II became the first Pontiff to visit Holy Name Cathedral, for a prayer service with Chicago's bishops as well as a concert featuring the music of Luciano Pavarotti and the Chicago Symphony Orchestra, in the nave of the cathedral. The congregation also prayed the Our Father in Latin at the request of the Pope.

See also

List of Catholic cathedrals in the United States
List of cathedrals in the United States

References

External links

 
 Archdiocese of Chicago

19th-century Roman Catholic church buildings in the United States
Cathedrals in Chicago
Churches on the National Register of Historic Places in Illinois
Gothic Revival church buildings in Illinois
Patrick Keely buildings
Properties of religious function on the National Register of Historic Places in Chicago
Roman Catholic cathedrals in Illinois
Roman Catholic churches completed in 1875
Roman Catholic churches in Chicago